Iliuță is a Romanian masculine given name and a surname. Notable people with the name include:

Ana Iliuță (born 1958), Romanian rower
Iliuţă Dăscălescu (born 1972), Romanian wrestler

Romanian masculine given names
Romanian-language surnames